Mohamed Traoré (born 17 May 1993 in Conakry) is a Guinean footballer who currently plays as a winger for FK Blansko on loan from FC Zbrojovka Brno.

Personal life
Traoré was born in Conakry, Guinea. His favorite player is a Brazilian retired footballer Ronaldo.

Football career

Early career
He started playing football at Conakry by local club FC Touba.

Aubervilliers
At the age of 16 he moved to the France to his uncle, where he stayed. After five months he joined FCM Aubervilliers playing CFA. He did not receive many opportunities to play, but he scored in the final match of youth tournament at Stade de France.

Zbrojovka Brno

2012–13 season
During the autumn of 2012 he was on trial at FC Zbrojovka Brno. In January 2013, he signed a three-year contract there. After scoring 2 goals in 8 games for the reserve team, he got a chance to play for Zbrojovka's first team on 11 November 2012 in their game against Sparta, where he came in the game as a substitute for Milan Lutonský in the 81st minute. On 1 February 2013, in the friendly match against Daegu FC, he scored his premiere goal for the first team.
He was part of the Zbrojovka youth team that won the Czech U-21 Junior League in 2013.

2013–14 season
Traoré scored his first Zbrojovka goal in the home game against Bohemians on 29 July 2013 on an assist by Pavel Zavadil in a 5-1 win.

On 26 August 2013 Traore collapsed after league match at Ostrava. He underwent surgery with clogged arteries in Ostrava. According to the doctors, extensive myocardial infarction could result in death. Traoré is from their perspective exceptional case, certainly the first in the country and possibly in the world. On 30 August 2013 Traoré left the hospital and continues home treatment. During the 2014-15 season he prepared individually and in the meantime underwent several medical examinations. Professional football was not recommended to him.

Loan to Tišnov 
Since August 2014, he has been trying lower level football to restart his career. In AFK Tišnov he plays 1.B třída, group A, which is the seventh tier of Czech football and the third tier of South Moravian Region. He scored twelve goals in the first half of the season, becoming the second best goalscorer in the competition. According to Zbrojovka, his condition has highly improved in the past period. From 12 January 2015, he started training with the Zbrojovka Brno U-21 team in full workload, but still does not play any matches. In January 2015, he got permission to play warm-up matches.
He became the top goalscorer with 33 goals in 25 matches.

Loan to Blansko
During the winter break 2015−2016, Traoré joined Czech Fourth Division side FK Blansko on a half-season-long loan. He made his debut on 19 March in their 4–3 away win against Rosice, in which he scored 2 goals.

Career statistics

Club

Honours
Zbrojovka Brno
Czech U-21 Junior League: 2012-2013

References

External links
 Profile at FC Zbrojovka Brno official site
 Profile at Foot-National.com
 

1993 births
Living people
Guinean footballers
Czech First League players
FC Zbrojovka Brno players
Sportspeople from Conakry
Guinean expatriate footballers
Expatriate footballers in France
Expatriate footballers in the Czech Republic
Association football wingers